This article lists the winners and nominees for the Billboard Music Award for Top Dance/Electronic Album.

Winners and nominees

2011  – 2013: Top Dance Album2013  – 2013: Top EDM Album2014  – present: Top Dance/Electronic Album

Artists with multiple wins and nominations

3 wins
 Lady Gaga

2 wins
 The Chainsmokers
 Lindsey Stirling

7 nominations
 Lady Gaga

6 nominations
 Skrillex

5 nominations
 The Chainsmokers
 David Guetta

4 nominations
 Avicii
 Kygo

3 nominations
 Lindsey Stirling
 Odesza
2 nominations
 Calvin Harris
 Daft Punk
 Deadmau5
 Illenium
 LMFAO
 Major Lazer
 Zedd

References

Billboard awards
Album awards